ELA Aviación, SL is a Spanish aircraft manufacturer based in Córdoba, Andalusia. The company specializes in the design and manufacture of autogyros in the form of ready-to-fly aircraft.

The company is a sociedad limitada (SL), a Spanish limited liability company.

The company was formed in 1996 and produces the open-cockpit ELA 07 series of autogyros, including the ELA 07 Agro agricultural aircraft, the ELA 07 Cougar for recreational touring use and the ELA 07S for flight training. The ELA 09 Junior is an entry-level open-cockpit autogyro, introduced in the mid-2010s. The company also produces an enclosed cockpit autogyro, the ELA 10 Eclipse.

Aircraft

References

External links

Aircraft manufacturers of Spain
Ultralight aircraft
Autogyros
Companies of Andalusia
Córdoba, Spain
Spanish companies established in 1996